Nadia Tass is an Australian theatre director and film director and producer. She is known for the films Malcolm (1986) and The Big Steal (1990), as well as an extensive body of work in the theatre, both in Australia and internationally.

Early life and education
Tass was born in Florina, Macedonia, northern Greece before moving to live permanently in Australia.

Career

Film
Since 1986 she has directed many feature films. Known for directing Australian classic films Malcolm and The Big Steal, some of Tass's other feature works include Rikky and Pete, Mr Reliable, Amy, Matching Jack, Fatal Honeymoon, and Oleg.

She has also directed films and television movies in America. Her first feature in the US was Pure Luck starring Danny Glover and Martin Short.

Theatre
Tass has an extensive history of theatre direction with a diverse range of works. She has directed improvised theatre, classic plays, contemporary pieces and musical theatre. Early works include productions of The Merchant of Venice, Macbeth, numerous plays by Euripides including  Medea, and by Aristophanes including Lysistrata, Chekhov's The Birds, Three Sisters, and Blood Wedding by Federico Garcia Lorca.

In later work, Tass directed This Effing Lady by Maureen Sherlock at the Brunswick Ballroom (2021) and Wicked Sisters by Alma De Groen for Griffin Theatre in Sydney (2020).

In 2019, she directed Masterpieces of the Oral and Intangible Heritage of Humanity by Heather McDonald, a Pulitzer Prize finalist, for Signature Theatre in the Washington, D.C., area.

Also in 2019, she directed Fern Hill, by Michael Tucker, at 59E59 Theaters in New York City.

In 2018 Tass directed David Williamson's Sorting Out Rachel for Sydney's Ensemble Theatre, followed by Marisa Smith's Sex and Other Disturbances for Portland Stage in Maine, USA; Fern Hill by Michael Tucker for New Jersey Rep; Ear to the Edge of Time by Alana Valentine at The Seymour Centre in Sydney.

In 2016, Tass directed the Ensemble Theatre production of Jane Cafarella's e-baby. It was the Sydney premiere of the play. Tass described the work as "a play for today – the advances in medicine create a new world that allows new possibilities – in e-baby we enter that world and explore the raw truth, the unbridled joy and the paradox of surrogacy through a carefully woven story of love, generosity and a newborn child."

In 2016 Tass directed Disgraced by Ayad Akhtar for the Melbourne Theatre Company (MTC), Extinction by Hannie Rayson for Red Stitch/GPAC, The Book Club for AKA in London and Melbourne, and Uncle Vanya by Chekhov (adapted by Annie Baker) for Red Stitch.

Tass' 2002 production of The Lion, The Witch and The Wardrobe toured Australia and garnered her a Helpmann Award nomination for Best Director of a Musical.

Other roles
Tass has presented masterclasses around the world.  She regularly lectures at the Victorian College of the Arts (Melbourne), and at Deakin University, where she is an adjunct professor. Tass continues to mentor young directors and actors from various educational institutions.

She has been a member of the board of the Australian Directors' Guild, and is a member of several professional associations, including the Directors Guild of America; the Screen Producers Association of Australia; the Australian Film Institute; and the  Australian Academy of Cinema and Television Arts.

Tass has been appointed to the juries of many film festival juries, including:
 Hawaii International Film Festival – for judging of main awards 1988
 St Tropez Film Festival – Head of jury 2008
 Asian Festival of First Films – 2008
 Pune International Film Festival – Head of jury 2012
 Directors Guild of America (DGA) – Documentary jury 2021
 Cinefest Oz - Head of jury 2021
 Australian Academy of Cinema and Television Arts (AACTA) – International chapter juror annually

Honours and recognition
Tass' films have earned over 70 international awards and 23 Australian Film Institute (AFI) nominations, while garnering nine wins including Best Film and Best Director. Her films that have awards and nominations include, most notably, Malcolm (1986); Amy (1997); The Miracle Worker (2000); and Matching Jack (2011).

In theatre,  The Lion, The Witch and The Wardrobe (2003) earned a nomination for Best Direction of a Musical in the Helpmann Awards.

She has also been honoured with several personal awards, including:
 Film Victoria Screen Leader Award for Outstanding Leadership, Achievement and Service to the Screen Industry (2014)
 Byron Kennedy Award for pursuit of excellence (1986)
 Australian Hellenic Award for Excellence (1987)
 Hellenic Award for the Arts (1999)

Tass has had the breadth of her film work presented internationally as retrospective events, including:
 American Cinematheque, Los Angeles USA (2012)
 New Delhi, India (1997)
 Cape Town and Johannesburg, South Africa (1994)
 Moscow Film Festival, Russia (1990)

Filmography 
This list includes films directed by Tass.
Feature films

 Malcolm (1986)
 Rikky and Pete (1988)
 The Big Steal (1990)
 Pure Luck (1991)
 Stark (1993) (feature cut)
 Mr. Reliable (1996)
 Amy (1997)
 Samantha: An American Girl Holiday (2004)
 Felicity: An American Girl Adventure (2005)
 Matching Jack (2010)
 Fatal Honeymoon (2012)
 Lea to the Rescue (2016)
 Oleg (2021)

Films for television
 The Miracle Worker (2000)
 Child Star: The Shirley Temple Story (2001)
 Undercover Christmas (2003)
 Custody (2007)

 Other
 Stark (TV miniseries 1993)
Isolation Restaurant (short film, 2020)

Theatre
Other theatrical productions by Tass include:
 This Effing Lady by Maureen Sherlock (2021) AKA, Brunswick Ballroom
 Wicked Sisters by Alma De Groen (2020) Griffin Theatre Company
 Fern Hill by Michael Tucker (2019) 59E59 Theaters
 Masterpieces of the Oral and Intangible Heritage of Humanity by Heather McDonald (2019) Signature Theatre
 Ear To The Edge Of Time by Alana Valentine (2018)
 Fern Hill by Michael Tucker (2018) NJ Rep Company
 Sex and Other Disturbances by Marisa Smith (2018) Portland Stage
 Sorting Out Rachel by David Williamson (2018) Ensemble Theatre
 Uncle Vanya by Anton Chekhov, adapted by Annie Baker (2016) Red Stitch Actors Theatre 
 e-Baby by Jane Cafarella (2016) Ensemble Theatre
 Disgraced by Ayad Akhtar (2016) Melbourne Theatre Company
 Extinction by Hannie Rayson (2016) GPAC, Red Stitch Actors Theatre
 The Book Club by Roger Hall (2016) AKA, Melbourne & London productions
 The Flick by Annie Baker (2014) Red Stitch Actors Theatre
 The Other Place by Sharr White (2013) Melbourne Theatre Company
 Promises, Promises by Neil Simon (2012) The Production Company

References

Further reading

External links
 
 Nadia Tass at Cascade Films

Australian film producers
Australian television actresses
Australian film directors
Australian women film directors
Greek emigrants to Australia
Living people
People from Florina
Year of birth missing (living people)